Lyukman Rasakovich Adams (born 24 September 1988, in St. Petersburg) is a Russian triple jumper. Adams is of Nigerian and Russian descent. In February 2019, the Court of Arbitration for Sport handed him a four-year ban for doping, starting from 31 January 2019.

Biography 
His father is Nigerian and his mother is Russian. He was born and raised in St. Petersburg.

His brother Layonel Adams is a professional footballer and plays for FC Turan.

Doping Scandal 
Adams received a four-year ban from athletics after being found guilty of doping by the Court of Arbitration for Sport on 31 January 2019. The ruling also disqualifies all of Adams' results achieved from 16 July 2012 to 14 September 2014.

International competitions

See also
List of doping cases in athletics

References

External links

1988 births
Living people
Athletes from Saint Petersburg
Russian male triple jumpers
Olympic male triple jumpers
Olympic athletes of Russia
Athletes (track and field) at the 2012 Summer Olympics
World Athletics Championships athletes for Russia
European Athletics Championships medalists
Russian Athletics Championships winners
Russian people of Nigerian descent
Russian sportspeople in doping cases
Doping cases in athletics